The 2000 All-SEC football team consists of American football players selected to the All-Southeastern Conference (SEC) chosen by various selectors for the 2000 NCAA Division I-A football season.

Auburn running back Rudi Johnson was unanimously voted the AP SEC Offensive Player of the Year. Tennessee defensive tackle John Henderson was unanimously voted the AP SEC Defensive Player of the Year.

Offensive selections

Quarterbacks
Ben Leard, Auburn (AP-1)
Rex Grossman, Florida (AP-2)

Running backs
Rudi Johnson*, Auburn (AP-1)
Travis Henry*, Tennessee (AP-1)
Derek Watson, South Carolina (AP-2)
Dicenzo Miller, Miss. St. (AP-2)

Wide receivers
Jabar Gaffney*, Florida (AP-1, Coaches-1)
Josh Reed*, LSU (AP-1)
Dan Stricker, Vanderbilt (AP-2)
Cedrick Wilson, Tennessee (AP-2)

Centers
Louis Williams, LSU (AP-1)
Michael Fair, Miss. St. (AP-2)

Guards
Omar Smith, Kentucky (AP-1)
Cedric Williams, South Carolina (AP-2)
Jonas Jennings, Georgia (AP-2)

Tackles
Pork Chop Womack, Mississippi State (AP-1)
Kenyatta Walker, Florida (AP-1, Coaches-1)
Mike Pearson, Florida (AP-2, Coaches-1)
Terrence Metcalf, Ole Miss (AP-2)

Tight ends
 Derek Smith, Kentucky (AP-1)
 Robert Royal, LSU (AP-2)

Defensive selections

Defensive ends
Will Overstreet, Tennessee (AP-1)
Derrick Burgess, Ole Miss (AP-1)
Alex Brown, Florida (AP-2, Coaches-1)
Conner Stephens, Miss. St. (AP-2)
Willie Blade, Miss. St. (AP-2)

Defensive tackles 
John Henderson*, Tennessee (AP-1)
Richard Seymour*, Georgia (AP-1)
Marcus Stroud, Georgia (AP-2)
Gerard Warren, Florida (AP-2, Coaches-2)

Linebackers
Quinton Caver, Arkansas (AP-1)
Kalimba Edwards, South Carolina (AP-1)
Mario Haggan, Miss. St. (AP-1)
Trev Faulk, LSU (AP-2)
Eric Westmoreland, Tennessee (AP-2)
Jamie Winborn, Vanderbilt (AP-2)
Alex Lincoln, Auburn (AP-2)

Cornerbacks
Lito Sheppard, Florida (AP-1, Coaches-1)
Fred Smoot, Miss. St. (AP-1)
Tim Wansley, Georgia (AP-2)
Syniker Taylor, Ole Miss (AP-2)

Safeties 
Pig Prather, Miss. St. (AP-1)
Todd Johnson, Florida (AP-1)
Ken Lucas, Ole Miss (AP-2)
Andre Lott, Tennessee (AP-2)

Special teams

Kickers
Alex Walls, Tennessee (AP-1)
Jeff Chandler, Florida (AP-2, Coaches-2)
Scott Westerfield, Miss. St. (AP-2)

Punters
Damon Duval, Auburn (AP-1)
Richie Butler, Arkansas (AP-2)

All purpose/return specialist
Deuce McAllister, Ole Miss (AP-1)
Derek Watson, South Carolina (AP-2)

Key

AP = Associated Press.

Coaches = selected by the SEC coaches

* = unanimous selection of AP

See also
2000 College Football All-America Team

References

All-Southeastern Conference
All-SEC football teams